White Widow is a balanced hybrid strain of Cannabis indica and Cannabis sativa that was created and developed by Shantibaba whilst he worked at the Greenhouse Seed Company.

White Widow has been described as "among the most popular [strains] in the world" by Popular Science magazine. The strain won the Cannabis Cup in 1995.

Related strains
 Black Widow - the renamed original white widow when Shantibaba moved his genetics to Mr. Nice Seedbank.
White Russian – An indica-dominant hybrid, that is a cross of White Widow and AK-47.
Blue Widow - A sativa-dominant (60%) hybrid, that is a cross of White Widow and Blueberry.
Moby Dick - A sativa-dominant (60%) hybrid, that is a cross of White Widow and Haze.

See also
Cannabis strains
Medical cannabis
Glossary of cannabis terms
List of cannabis strains

References

External links

Cannabis strains